My Health LA (abbreviated MHLA) is a no-cost health care program for low-income Los Angeles County residents, designed to benefit between 400,000 and 700,000 LA County residents who are ineligible for Medi-Cal, most of those being undocumented immigrants.

The program establishes a network of community clinics who provide primary care needs for enrolled patients under the medical home model, with incentives to providers to coordinate care and manage utilization. The Los Angeles County Board of Supervisors allocated  in annual funding to support the program.

The program, which was launched on October 1, 2014, is administered by the Los Angeles County Department of Health Services. MHLA succeeded the County's previous program, Healthy Way LA. As of September 2016, MHLA has enrolled 147,314 patients.

See also
Healthcare in California
Healthcare availability for undocumented immigrants in the United States
Immigrant health care in the United States
Los Angeles County Department of Health Services

References

External links 
 

Healthcare in Los Angeles
Organizations based in Los Angeles County, California
Medical and health organizations based in California